Kamskoye Ustye (Qama Tamağı) is an urban locality (an urban-type settlement) and the administrative center of Kamsko-Ustyinsky District in the Republic of Tatarstan, Russia, located on the Kuybyshev Reservoir, near the confluence of the Volga and Kama Rivers,  from the republic's capital of Kazan. As of the 2010 Census, its population was 4,482.

History
It was established in the 17th century and was known as the selo of Bogorodskoye until 1925. Urban-type settlement status was granted to it in 1939. Kamskoye Ustye served as the district administrative center in 1930–1963, and again since 1965.

Administrative and municipal status
Within the framework of administrative divisions, the urban-type settlement of Kamskoye Ustye serves as the administrative center of Kamsko-Ustyinsky District, of which it is a part. As a municipal division, Kamskoye Ustye is incorporated within Kamsko-Ustyinsky Municipal District as Kamskoye Ustye Urban Settlement.

Economy
Alabaster, lime, and sulfur have been mined here since the 19th century. Industrial facilities include a dairy factory and several construction and agricultural enterprises.

Demographics

In 1989, the majority of the population was ethnically Russian (52.4%) and Tatar (44.0%).

References

Notes

Sources

Urban-type settlements in the Republic of Tatarstan
Tetyushsky Uyezd